Fiksi., sometimes stylized as fiksi. (English: Fiction.) is a 2008 Indonesian thriller film directed by Mouly Surya in her directorial debut. It tells the story of Alisha, a young woman who moves to a cheap apartment from her mansion, where she meets people with unique characters and stories which she soon incorporates into her obsessive fantasy. According to Surya, the film is an "adult re-invention of Alice in Wonderland" with the character of Alisha being an inverted version of Alice.

The film stars Ladya Cheryl in the role of Alisha, for which she was received a Best Actress nomination at the 28th Citra Awards. Surya won the Citra Award for Best Director, becoming the first and–as of 2020–the only woman to ever win the honor.

Synopsis 
Alisha (Ladya Cheryl) never feel comfortable staying in her cool and spacious home until one day she meets Bari (Donny Alamsyah) who introduces her the meaning of love.

Cast 

 Ladya Cheryl as Alisha, a young woman who moves to a cheap apartment and became neighbors to Bari and Renta
 Donny Alamsyah as Bari, Renta's long-time boyfriend of seven years with whom Alisha develops an obsession after she saw him clean her mansion's pool one day
 Kinaryosih as Renta, Bari's girlfriend of seven years and a Psychology student
 Soultan Saladin as Alisha's rich father
 Rina Hasyim as Tuti, the housekeeper in Alisha's father's mansion
 Egy Fedly as Bambang, Alisha's personal chauffeur and bodyguard
 Inong as Alisha's mother, who committed suicide by gunshot when she was young
 Aty Cancer as Dirah, one of the apartment's residents who is a cat lady with traumatic past
 José Rizal Manua as an old man who has never entered his apartment unit who used to own the land where the apartment building stands

Production 
Surya met future husband and collaborator Rama Adi while working as assistant directors in Rako Prijanto's 2007 films D'Bijis and Love Is Red. In 2007, the two of them co-founded the film production company Cinesurya and secured funding to produce Fiksi. based on a screenplay Surya developed herself. They sought advice from established filmmaker Riri Riza on how to produce their first feature film, who told them to work with someone more experienced in shaping the project, eventually finding those collaborators in producer Tia Hasibuan and writer-director Joko Anwar. Anwar spent a month working on Surya's draft and was credited as a co-writer.

In March 2020, a behind the scene film directed by then unknown Yosep Anggi Noen and B. W. Purbanegara was released on Cinesurya's YouTube channel.

Release 
Fiksi. was released theatrically on June 19, 2008 in Indonesia. It was screened at the Busan International Film Festival and Jakarta International Film Festival in 2008 as well as at the Asiexpo Lyon Asian Film Festival in 2011 and Tokyo International Film Festival in 2016.

Reception 
Film critic Eric Sasono commented that Surya's direction "almost fails to deliver" due to the story's "lack of plausibility". However, he praised how Surya dared to tell a story that is "out of the comfort zone" of Indonesia's films. Similarly, Maggie Lee of The Hollywood Reporter was critical of the film's "jumbled" time sequences and laid back pace, but praised the story's "overlapping plots" which she called "weirdly fascinating in their own right".

Richard Kuipers of Variety was more positive, calling the film "an intriguing web around a lonely rich girl's obsession with a handsome writer" and praising Surya's direction as "briskly paced and has well-drawn characters".

Awards and nominations

References

External links 

Citra Award winners
2000s Indonesian-language films
2008 films
Indonesian thriller films
2008 thriller films
2008 directorial debut films